Dózsa II. Is a district of Dunaújváros, Hungary. It was planned as a sport centre. There were planned stadiums and other fields for sporting. It is surrounded by districts built to loess. Its central style is by the surrounding buildings. Main attraction here is the Roman Catholic church, this is the centre of the public life of the district.

Sources
 Dunaújvárosi Köztéri Szobrai, Várnai Gyula - Gyöngyössy Csaba, 1999, Ma Kiadó,  
 Dunapentele Sztálinváros, Dunaújváros Numizmatikai Emlékei 1950-2010, Asztalos Andrásné,

External links
 Dunaújváros Dózsa II. városrész

Dunaújváros